Clow is a surname. Notable people with the surname include:

Cheney Clow (1734–1788), American loyalist
Herbert Clow (1899–1977), American football player
James Clow (1790–1861), minister
Andrew Clow (1890–1957), British colonial governor
Lee Clow (born 1943), American advertising executive
Ross Clow, New Zealand politician